Abeer Mahmoud Mubarak Al-Nahar (born 13 February 1991) is a Jordanian international footballer who plays as a forward.

Club career

In May 2015 Al-Nahar played for Amman Club in a 5–3 win over rivals Shabab Al-Ordon, which secured the Jordan Women's Football League title.

International career

As a 15-year-old Al-Nahar was included in the Jordan national team squad who were beaten 13–0 by Japan at the 2006 Asian Games in Doha.

In 2011 Al-Nahar and her father were outspoken critics of FIFA's ban on hijabs. Two years later she got six goals as Jordan "hammered" Kuwait 21–0 in 2014 AFC Women's Asian Cup qualification.

During Jordan's victorious 2014 WAFF Women's Championship campaign, Al-Nahar scored four goals in a 7–0 win over Qatar and finished as the tournament top scorer. At the 2014 Asian Games she was shown a red card in Jordan's 2–2 draw with Chinese Taipei.

International goals

References

External links
 

Living people
1991 births
Jordanian women's footballers
Jordanian Muslims
Jordan women's international footballers
Women's association football forwards
Footballers at the 2006 Asian Games
Footballers at the 2010 Asian Games
Footballers at the 2014 Asian Games
Jordanian women's futsal players
Asian Games competitors for Jordan
Jordan Women's Football League players